Samuel Pastor District is one of eight districts of Camaná Province in Peru.

References

Districts of the Camaná Province
Districts of the Arequipa Region